Undibacterium jejuense is a Gram-negative, aerobic and motile bacterium from the genus of Undibacterium, which has been isolated from forest soil from the Jeju Island and water from the Seoho lake in Korea.

References

Burkholderiales
Bacteria described in 2014